Heber Reginald Bishop (March 2, 1840 – December 10, 1902) was a noted businessman and philanthropist of the late 19th and early 20th centuries. His collections of art, especially his noted collection of jade, were donated to museums. "An industrialist and entrepreneur, Mr. Bishop was an active patron of the arts and a Trustee of the Metropolitan Museum during its formative years."

Early life
Heber Reginald Bishop was born in Medford, Massachusetts in 1840 to Nathaniel Holmes Bishop (1789–1850) and Mary Smith Farrar (1806–1881). Bishop's family immigrated from Ipswich, England to the Massachusetts colony in 1685, settling in Medford, Massachusetts.

Bishop received a commercial education, until he moved to Remedios, Cuba at the age of 19 to begin work in the sugar business.

Career
Within two years of moving to Cuba, Bishop had started a sugar refinery business there and began the Bishop & Company, which was sold in 1873 when he returned to the United States, first to his father-in-law's "Cunningham Castle" in Irvington, New York, and later to the Bishop home at 881 Fifth Ave. He then invested in a number of banking firms, iron and steel companies, railroads, and western mining companies.

He was a member of the Chamber of Commerce of New York, a director of the Chicago, Rock Island and Pacific Railroad Company, the Chandler Iron Company, the Metropolitan Trust Company of New York, the Metropolitan Elevated Railroad Company, the New York Elevated Railroad, and the Lackawanna Iron and Steel Company.

In 1878, his mansion in Irvington on the Hudson River burned down.  The building had a front of about 175 feet and was erected in 1863 by his father-in-law.

Collections

Jade Collection
The Bishop Jade Collection donated to the Metropolitan Museum of Art in 1902 included not only artistic pieces from China and Japan, but also selections from Mexico, Central America, the northwest coast of America, Swiss lake dwellings, France, Italy, New Zealand and elsewhere. It included a rare crystal of jadeite and a single mass of nephrite from Jordanów Śląski, formerly known as Jordansmühl, Silesia.

"The one thousand numbers included in the Bishop collection display first a mineralogical section in which samples of the minerals are shown from every known place where they may be found. An archaeological section presents specimens of implements, weapons and ornaments in which the material was wrought. The remainder of the collection embraces the art objects upon which the utmost resources of the glyptic art have been lavished. These have been gathered from China, India, Annam, Europe and New Zealand, and comprise every conceivable object of limpid beauty to which the material lends itself. Vases from China, with graceful lines, elegant shape, and patiently carved decoration; perfect boxes of soft sheen with jewelled decoration from India; and the modern work of Europe they all give the highest presentment of sensuous charm and artistry."

Jade Collection Catalog

An enormous catalog in two volumes, entitled Investigations and Studies in Jade, was made of the collection.  The catalog, edited by Dr. Robert Lilley and assisted by R. W. Douglas, was limited to 100 numbered sets. The first eight sets were distributed to Bishop's children, two sets were sent to the Library of Congress to obtain copyright, and the rest were distributed to heads of government, libraries, and museums. Each set cost $1,800 to produce.

Many specialists contributed to the book, including: Dr. George Frederick Kunz, Dr. Stephen Wootton Bushell, Dr. William Hallock, Dr. Samuel Lewis Penfield, Dr. Harry Ward Foote, Dr. Joseph Paxton Iddings, Professor Frank Wigglesworth Clarke, Mr. Ira Harvey Woolson, Mr. Logan Waller Page, Dr. Charles Palache, Luis Valentin Pirsson, Dr. Henry Stephens Washington, Dr. Henry Talbot Walden, Professor L. von Jaczewski, Dr. A. B. Meyer, Dr Joseph Edkins, Dr. Ludwig Leiner, Mrs. Zelia Nuttall, Miss Eliza Ruhamah Scidmore, Dr. Franz Berwerth, Ernst Weinschenk, and Tadamasa Hayashi.

The bound volumes were 19 x 26 inches and weighed, respectively, 70 and 55 pounds. The paper used for the volumes was specially made by the Brown Paper Company, and weighed 176 pounds to the ream. The stock was a combination of pure white cotton rags and linen, and no chemicals were employed. "The illustrations were made by various processes; etchings, wood-cuts, and lithographs. The following etchers and engravers took part in the work: Walter M. Aikman (b. 1857); Charles Jean Louis Courtrv (b. 1846); Adolphe Alphonse Gery-Bichard (b. 1841); Paul Le Rat (b. 1840); Auguste Hilaire Leveille (b. 1840); Rodolphe Pignet (b. 1840); and Émile-Jean Sulpis."

Contents of the catalog are: volume 1. General introduction. Jade in China: Introduction. Yü shuo. A discourse on jade. (Translation) Yü shuo. A discourse on jade. (Chinese text) Yü tso t'ou. Illustrations of the modern manufacture of jade. Jade as a mineral. Methods of working jade. Worked jade. Bibliography (p. 257-260)--volume 2. Catalog: Brief introduction, with explanatory statement as to the arrangement. Mineralogical synopsis. Archaeological synopsis. Ancient or tomb pieces from China. Art objects, historical period.

In 2000, an eBay user attempted to fraudulently auction set #100 which was in the possession of The Philadelphia Rare Books and Manuscripts Company.  The same set was sold at auction by Christie's in November 2007 for HKD 3,487,500.

Other collections
Heber Bishop also donated a large collection of Alaskan antiquities to the American Museum of Natural History in 1879. He also collected, with the assistance of Major John Wesley Powell, a large collection of British Columbian ethnological artifacts, including the famous Haida canoe, which is 64 feet long, 8 feet wide and was hollowed out of a single tree trunk by the Heiltsuk tribe, formerly known as the Bella Bella tribe opposite Haida Gwaii.

Brayton Ives, a New York financier, made a collection of rare and historical swords. When he ceased collecting, the swords were sold, and through the efforts of Mr. Bishop, William Thompson Walters and the American Art Association, the valuable sword collection, valued at $15,000, was donated to the Metropolitan Museum of Art as well.

Personal life

He married Mary Cunningham (1842–1905), the second daughter of Elizabeth Griffiths (1809–1869) and Scottish born James C. Cunningham (1801–1870), who was a mechanical engineer and ship owner of Irvington, New York.  Cunningham operated successively in New York, Boston, and, starting in 1850, San Francisco, where he developed Cunningham's Wharf and was involved in the early development the city. Her sister, Jane Templeton Cunningham (1832–1888), was married to Darius Ogden Mills (1825–1910). Their daughter, Elisabeth Mills, married Ambassador Whitelaw Reid, and their son, Ogden Mills (1856-1929), was a prominent financier.

Together, Heber and Mary had eight children:

 Mary Cunningham Bishop (1864–1948), who died unmarried.
 Elizabeth Templeton Bishop (1865–1934), who married James Low Harriman (1856–1928), eldest son of Oliver Harriman
 Harriet Arnold Bishop (1866-1931), who married James Franklin Doughty Lanier (1858–1928), grandson of James Lanier.
 Heber Reginald Bishop Jr. (1868–1923), who married Mabel Wolverton Sard (1871–1923), who was previously married to Arthur Amory Jr. (1867–1898)
 James Cunningham Bishop (1870–1932), who married Abigail Adams Hancock (1872–1949), niece of Winfield Scott Hancock, and had five daughters.
 Francis Cunningham Bishop (1872–1927), who married Gertrude Sophia Pell (d. 1953) in 1906, and had three sons.
 Edith Bishop (1874–1959), who married Moses Taylor V (1871–1928), grandson of Moses Taylor, in 1896.  After his death, she married George James Guthrie Nicholson (1871–1950).
 Ogden Mills Bishop (1878–1955)

Bishop died on December 10, 1902, at his residence, 881 Fifth Avenue, after a long illness.  Bishop, his wife, and several of their children are interred in the Bishop mausoleum at Sleepy Hollow Cemetery, Sleepy Hollow, NY. It sits next to the Cunningham mausoleum erected by his wife's father, and a short distance from the Darius Ogden Mills and Whitelaw Reid mausoleums.

His estate, valued at approximately $3,500,000, was left in trust for his widow, children, sisters, and brother. He left funds to the Metropolitan Museum for the preservation of his collection.  By 1915, his estate's holdings in Standard Oil had increased in value by $1,450,000.

Society life
Mary's brother-in-law, Darius Ogden Mills, was instrumental in introducing the Bishops to elite New York business and society circles.  For example, Heber and his children Mary, Harriet, and Ogden were members of Ward McAllister's "Four Hundred" list, reportedly the number of people who could fit into Mrs. Astor's ballroom. His daughter Harriet's home, the James F. D. Lanier Residence, is a New York landmark. His daughter Edith and her husband owned many residences, including Annandale Farm in Mt. Kisco, NY, Glen Farm in Portsmouth, RI, and the Villa Taylor in Marrakesh, Morocco, where Winston Churchill and Franklin Delano Roosevelt "played hookey" during World War II. The Taylors would cruise to Morocco aboard their 310-foot steam yacht "Iolanda". In 1898, Bishop and his wife gave a red domino dance for 150 at their residence in New York.

An 1895 watercolor on ivory portrait of the four daughters is held by the New York Historical Society.  He was a member of the Metropolitan Club, the Union Club, the Union League Club, the New York Yacht Club, the City Club, the Turf and Field Club, the Century Association, the New England Society, the Mendelssohn Glee Club, the Chicago Club of Chicago, the Golf Club of Newport, the Turf Club of Newport, the American Hackney Horse Society of New York, the Boone and Crockett Club and the Civil Service Reform Association.

In 1899, Bishop rented Houghton Hall in England, where he hosted the Prince of Wales for a weekend of hunting.

References
Notes

Sources
 American Art Association. 1919. Antique Chinese porcelains, European ceramics, bronzes, Tiffany glass, "Salmagundi mugs" and Eklinton and Christofle reproductions.
 American Art Association. 1919. Catalogue of antique Chinese porcelains, European ceramics, bronzes, Tiffany glass, "Salmagundi mugs," bronzes, bric-a-brac and many Elkington and Christofle reproductions of antiques and armor in notable European museums. New York: American Art Association.
 Anderson Galleries, Inc. 1920. Furniture, rugs & art objects; including several pieces from the Heber R. Bishop sale. New York: Anderson Galleries.
 Anderson Galleries, Inc. 1911. Oriental porcelains, bronzes and other objects of art from the collection of the late Heber R. Bishop of New York City. New York: Anderson Auction Company.
 Metropolitan Museum of Art (New York, N.Y.). 1937. A private view for members of the Museum & their friends of a special exhibition of Italian renaissance prints and illustrated books: and of a new installation of the Heber R. Bishop collection of jade ... December 21, 1937. New York: The Museum press.
 Anderson Galleries, Inc. 1920. Furniture, rugs and art objects removed from the residence of Miss M.C. Bishop of New York City: ... several pieces from the Heber R. Bishop sale. New York: The Galleries.
 Kunz, George Frederick. 1903. Heber Reginald Bishop and his jade collection. Lancaster, Pa: The New era printing Company.
 Metropolitan Museum of Art (New York, N.Y.). 1902. The Heber R. Bishop collection of jade and other hard stones. Metropolitan Museum of Art.
 Metropolitan Museum of Art (New York, N.Y.), and Bishop Collection. 1909. Heber R. Bishop collection of jade and other hard stones. New York : Metropolitan Museum of Art.
 American Art Association, and Thomas E. Kirby. 1906. The art collection formed by the late Heber R. Bishop. New York: American Art Association.
 Bishop, Heber R., and Thomas E. Kirby. 1906. De luxe catalogue of the art collection formed by the late Heber R. Bishop, New York. New York: The American art Association [Press of J.J. Little & Co.].
 Kunz, George Frederick, and Heber R. Bishop. 1906. The printed catalogue of the Heber R. Bishop collection of jade. New York: Gilliss Press.
 Bishop, Heber R. 1911. Oriental porcelains, bronzes and other objects of art from the collection of the late Heber R. Bishop; and paintings by American and foreign artists from the Bishop and other collections by Diaz and others, to be sold at the Anderson Art Galleries April 12, 1911. New York: The Anderson Auction Co.
 Bishop Collection, and Heber R. Bishop. 1900. The Heber R. Bishop collection of jade and other hard stones. [New York]: The Metropolitan Museum of Art.
 Bishop Collection, Heber R. Bishop, George Frederick Kunz, Stephen W. Bushell, Robert Lilley, and Tadamasa Hayashi. 1906. The Bishop collection. Investigations and studies in jade. New York: Priv. Print. [The De Vinne Press]. OCLC: 14097767.
 Bishop, Heber R. 1893. Loan exhibition 1893: descriptive catalogue of works in bronze and iron loaned from the collection of Mr. Heber R. Bishop. New York: National Academy of Design.
 Metropolitan Museum of Art (New York, N.Y.). 1900. The Heber R. Bishop collection of jade and other hard stones. [New York]: The Museum.
 American Art Association. 1906. Catalogue of the art collection formed by the late Heber R. Bishop, New York. New York: The Association.
 Art, Metropolitan Museum Of. 2013. Heber r. bishop collection. [S.l.]: Book On Demand Ltd.

External links

 
 
 The Bishop Collection: Investigations and Studies in Jade - Preliminary Edition (1900); Printed by the Mershon Company Press
  Investigations and Studies in Jade - Volume 1 (1906) Edited by Dr. Robert Lilley, New York; Privately Printed by the De Vinne Press
  Investigations and Studies in Jade - Volume 2 (1906) Edited by Dr. Robert Lilley, New York; Privately Printed by the De Vinne Press

1840 births
1902 deaths
People from Medford, Massachusetts
People from Sleepy Hollow, New York
Philanthropists from New York (state)
Hardstone carving
Jade
People included in New York Society's Four Hundred
19th-century American philanthropists
Businesspeople in the sugar industry
American people of English descent
People from the Upper East Side
American corporate directors
Businesspeople from New York City
People from Irvington, New York
American art collectors
Burials at Sleepy Hollow Cemetery